This is a list of songs having lyrics in Latin.

This list contains songs that are performed in Latin by the named performers. Songs that sample other recorded music in Latin do not become eligible only by virtue of that sampling. Songs with only a Latin refrain are also excluded.

Classical music
Almost all Catholic liturgical music composed before the middle of the 20th century, including literally thousands of settings of the ordinary of the mass (Gloria, Credo, Sanctus, Agnus Dei), the ordinary and proper of the Requiem mass, psalms, canticles (such as the Magnificat), antiphons, and motets. Famous examples include:
 Johann Sebastian Bach – Mass in B Minor, four Missae, Magnificat, cantata BWV 191 
 Wolfgang Amadeus Mozart – Ave Verum Corpus, Requiem
 Carl Orff – Carmina Burana, Meum est propositum in taberna mori
 Giovanni Pierluigi da Palestrina – Missa Papae Marcelli
 Antonio Vivaldi – Nulla in mundo pax sincera
The libretto for the opera-oratorio Oedipus rex by Igor Stravinsky is in Latin, as well as the 1963 choral composition Cantata misericordium by Benjamin Britten.

Hymns and carols
 "Adeste Fideles"
 "Boar's Head Carol"
 "Gaudeamus Igitur", also known as De Brevitate Vitae
 "Gaudete"
 "Gloria Tibi Domine"
 "Io Vivat"
 "Tempus Adest Floridum"
 "Veni, Veni, Emmanuel"

Light classical music
 Sarah Brightman – In Paradisum

Popular music

Folk
 Die Irrlichter – Totus Floreo, Cantum Corvi, Angelus ad Virginem, Orientes Partibus, Puer Nobis Nascitur, Gaudete
 Garmarna – Euchari, O Viridissima Virga, O Frondens Virga
 Ougenweide – Totus Floreo, Terra Sinus Aperit, Gaudete
 Steeleye Span – Gaudete †

Metal
 After Forever – Mea Culpa, Leaden Legacy
 Avenged Sevenfold – Requiem
 Behemoth – Ora Pro Nobis Lucifer
 Ghost B.C. – Infestissumam
 In Extremo – Ave Maria
 Iced Earth – In Sacred Flames
 Helloween – Lavdate Dominvm
 maudlin of the Well – The Ferryman
 Deathspell Omega – Obombration, First Prayer, Malign Paradigm
 Death SS – Black Mass
 Dimmu Borgir – Abrahadabra: The Invaluable Darkness (choir)
 Epica:
 The Phantom Agony: Adyta (The Neverending Embrace – Prelude), Facade of Reality, Illusive Consensus, "The Phantom Agony"
 Consign to Oblivion: Hunab K’u (A New Age Dawns), Dance of Fate,  The Last Crusade (A New Age Dawns Part I), Consign to Oblivion (A New Age Dawns Part III)
 The Divine Conspiracy: Indigo (Prologue), The Obsessive Devotion, Living a Lie (The Embrace that Smothers Part VIII), Fools of Damnation (The Embrace that Smothers Part IX), The Divine Conspiracy
 Design Your Universe: Samadhi (Prelude), Resign to Surrender (A New Age Dawns Part IV), Martyr of the Free World, Kingdom of Heaven (A New Age Dawns Part V), Design Your Universe (A New Age Dawns Part IV)
 Requiem for the Indifferent: Karma, Monopoly on Truth, Internal Warfare, Requiem for the Indifferent, Guilty Demeanor
 The Quantum Enigma: "Originem","The Second Stone","The Quantum Enigma:Kingdom Of Heaven II"
 The Holographic Principle: "Eidola","Tear Down Your Walls","The Holographic Principle:A Profound Understanding Of Reality" 
 The Solace System: "Architect of Light", "Decoded Poetry"
 Omega: "Alpha:Anteludium", "The Skeleton Key", "Gaia", "Kingdom Of Heaven Part III:The Antediluvian Universe"
 Ex Deo:
 Romulus: Cruor Nostri Abbas, Cry Havoc, In Her Dark Embrace, Invictus, Storm the Gates of Alesia
 Caligvla: Once Were Romans, Per Oculos Aquila, Pollice Verso
 Mayhem – De Mysteriis Dom Sathanas
 Nazgûl (Italian 'Symphonic' Black Metal band): All their discography is in Latin.
 Powerwolf: Raise Your Fist, Evangelist , Sactus Dominus, Fist by Fist (Sacralize or Strike), Killers with the cross, Stossgebet, Glaubenskraft, Sermon of Swords. Many of their other songs contain some lines in Latin, have a Latin name and/or are supported by a choir singing in Latin.
 Rhapsody of Fire – Ira Tenax
 Rotting Christ:
 Sanctus Diavolos: Visions of a Blind Order, Sanctimonius, Sanctus Diavolos
 Theogonia: Gaia Telus, Rege Diabolicus 
 Κατά τον δαίμονα εαυτού: Grandis spiritus diavolos
 The Heretics: Dies Irae, Fire, God and Fear and The Voice of the Universe (passages only).
Saltatio Mortis - Factus de materia, Totus Floreo
 Sabaton – The Lion From The North and Wehrmacht
 Subway to Sally – Ad Mortem Festinamus
 Tristania:
 Widow's Weeds: Preludium..., ...Postludium
 Beyond the Veil: Angina
 World of Glass: The Shining Path, Wormwood, Hatred Grows, Crushed Dreams (choir passages)
 Venom Inc.: Avé
 Xandria – A Prophecy of Worlds to Fall
 Zeal & Ardor - Coagula

Various
 Alice Cooper – My God
 Alizée- Veni Vedi Vici
 Abonos – Izlaz
 Abruptum – De Profundis Mors Vas Consumet
 Ace of Base – Happy Nation
 Angelo Branduardi – Ille mi par esse deo... Un dio mi pare
 Ataraxia – Maria Ceremoniale, Mundus Est Jocundum, Spiritus Ad Vindictam *
 Bára Basiková – Veni Domine †
 Bauhaus (band) – Stigmata Martyr
 Patrick Cassidy – Vide Cor Meum *
 Corvus Corax – Ante Casu Peccati (album, 1989), Inter Deum et Diabolum Semper Musica Est (album, 1993), Viator (album, 1998), Mille Anni Passi Sunt (album, 2000), Tritonus (album, 2004), Tempi Antiquii (album, 2004), Venus Vina Musica (album, 2006), Cantus Buranus II (album, 2008) * 
 Coven – Satanic Mass
 The Cranberries – Electric Blue Eyes
 D.Gray-man – Lala's Lullaby
 Dargaard – Caverna Obscura, Ave Atque Vale, Thy Fleeing Time
 Dark Sanctuary – Miserere
 Die Irrlichter – Totus Floreo
 Dissidia 012 Final Fantasy – Canto Mortis – An Undocumented Battle, Cantata Mortis
 Elfen Lied – Lillium
 Dovetree – multiple song titles...
 E Nomine – Das Testament (album), Schwarze Sonne (album) *
 E Nomine – Das Testament (album), Himmel oder Holle (album) *
 Electric Prunes – Mass in F Minor (album)
 Enigma – Sadeness (Part I), Mea Culpa (Part II)
 Enya – Pax Deorum, Tempus Vernum, Afer Ventus, Cursum perficio *
 Era – The Mass
 Erasure – Gaudete
 David Essex Oh What a Circus (Salve regina mater misericordiae)
 Estampie – Ave generosa, Stella splendens, O Fortuna *
 Eurielle – City of the Dead
 European anthem (unofficial)
 Fabrizio De André – Laudate hominem
 Faith and the Muse – Cantus, Chorus of the Furies
 Finisterra – Totus Floreo
 Franco Battiato – Delenda Carthago
 Fullmetal Alchemist: Brotherhood – Lapis Philosophorum
 Fullmetal Alchemist: Brotherhood – Trisha's Lullaby
 Globus – Preliator, Diem Ex Dei, In Memoriam
 Haggard – Pestilencia
 Nobuo Uematsu – Super Smash Bros. Brawl main theme
 Helium Vola – Omnis Mundi Creatura, Omnia Sol Temperat, Nummus, Veni Veni *
 Highland – Bella Stella
 H. P. Lovecraft – Gloria Patria
 I Am Ghost – The Denouement
 Industrial Monk – Magnificat *
 Roland Kadan - In tyrannos!, Cerebrum demitte, Domine!, Coronae me iam piget, De Panda et Catta et aliis animalibus, Undam secundam
 Itou Kanako – Lamento
 Jacula – Praesentia Domini
 Yuki Kajiura – Salva Nos
 Konstrakta – In corpore sano
 Kronos – Magica Europa, Party's (Partius?) Deorum
 Lacrimas Profundere – Priamus
 Lesiem – Fortitudo, Caritas, Fundamentum, Justitia, Invidia, Una terra, Occultum, Vivere, Liberta, Mater Gloria, Veni Creator Spiritus, Lacrimosa, Floreat, In Taberna Mori, Ave Fortuna, Agnus Dei, Pater Patriae, Navigator, Africa, Roma, Britannia, Coloris, Aureus, Diva, Paradisus, Poeta, Humilitas, Temperantia, Fides, Patientia, Spes, Prudentia, Vanitas, Bonitas *
 Libera – Gaudete, Sacris Solemnis, Sempiterna, Sanctus, Ave Maria, Recordare, Locus Iste, Stabat, Luminosa, Agnus Dei, Sancta, Angelis, Lux Aeterna, Ave Verum
 Little Mix – Lightning
 Luciano Ligabue – Libera nos a malo
 Magic Kingdom – Metallic Tragedy
 Mama Ladilla – Cunnilingus post mortem Fortitudo '
 Mecano – No es Serio este Cementerio
 Mediæval Bæbes – Salva Nos, Gaudete, Ecce Mundi Gaudium, Miseria Nomine, Verbum Caro, Veni, Veni *
 Alan Menken – Hellfire
 The Misfits – Halloween II
 Mocedades -  Pange linguam 
 My Ruin – Momento Mori
 Kumiko Noma – Lilium (Elfen Lied)
 Rosenstolz – Amo Vitam
 Sinéad O'Connor – Regina caeli, O filii et filiae
 Origa – Inner Universe
 Qntal – Ad mortem festinamus, Flamma, Omnis mundi illuminate, Stella splendens *
 Yoko Shimomura – Somnus
 Simon and Garfunkel – Benedictus
 Sopor Aeternus – Modela est
 Cat Stevens – O Caritas
 The Association – Requiem for the Masses
 The Streets – Memento Mori
 Tanzwut – Toccato, Caupona, Fatue
 Theatre of tragedy – Venus
 This Ascension – Gloria in Excelsis
 Ticklish Brother – Ficos et Olivas
 Tura Satana (band) – Omnia Vinat Amor
 U2 – Gloria
 Nobuo Uematsu – Advent: One-Winged Angel, Divinity, Liberi Fatali, One-Winged Angel, Yakusoku no chi ~The Promised Land~
 Unto Ashes – Quid Vides, Estuans Interius *
 Rufus Wainwright – Agnus Dei
 SIE Sound Team – The First Hunter
 Eric Whitacre – Lux Aurumque
 Akiko Shikata – HOLLOW, Agnus Dei
 Haruka Shimotsuki – Key of Paradise
 Keiki Kobayashi – The Unsung War (Ace Combat 5: The Unsung War)
 Paul Mottram – Tempestus
 Jesper Kyd – Apocalypse
 Murray Gold – Vale Decem, Song of Freedom
 Jacek Kaczmarski – Lekcja historii klasycznej
 Warren Zevon - Life'll Kill Ya from album Life'll Kill Ya
 Over the Garden Wall (feat. Audio Clayton) – Potatus Et Molassus
 Alan Menken, Chorus Of The Hunchback Of Notre Dame - Sanctuary!
 Alan Menken, Stephen Schwartz, The Hunchback of Notre Dame Choir - Entr'acte
 In the Green Original Company - O Virga ac Diadema
 In the Green Original Company - O Viridissima Virga
 Ola Gjeilo - Unicornis Captivatur

Notes
 * These artists have recorded a significant body of work in Latin. Titles given are representative or well known.
 † This symbol indicates a hit single.

Other music
 The early music ensemble Rondellus has performed acoustic renditions of Black Sabbath songs in Latin. 
 Dr. Jukka Ammondt has performed a number of songs by Elvis Presley translated into Latin.

References

Latin Lyrics
Latin language
Lyrics